English script is a cursive style, used especially for capital letters, which first emerged in 18th century England, and later spread across the world. This very elaborate script appeared with the spread of the metallic quill.

In the late 19th and early 20th centuries, calligraphy experienced a new-found resurgence due to its use in advertising, magazine design and commercial presentation.

Citations

See also

 Western calligraphy

Writing
Latin-script calligraphy
Palaeography